The Men's 800 metre freestyle competition at the 2019 World Championships was held on 23 and 24 July 2019. The defending champion was Gabriele Detti, but he finished 5th in the final. The champion, Gregorio Paltrinieri, was the defending bronze medalist.

Records
Prior to the competition, the existing world and championship records were as follows.

Results

Heats
The heats were held on 23 July at 11:05.

Final
The final was held on 24 July at 20:02.

References

Men's 800 metre freestyle